Stephen, Steven or Steve Anderson may refer to:

Arts and entertainment
Steve Anderson (bass guitarist), British musician
Steve Anderson (director), director of The Big Empty and Fuck
Steve Anderson (musician) (born 1969), musician and songwriter
Steve F. Anderson, associate professor and founding director of the Ph.D. program in Media Arts and Practice at the USC School of Cinematic Arts
Stephen Anderson (artist) (born 1969/70), American artist
Stephen Milburn Anderson (1948–2015), American film director/producer/writer
Stephen P. Anderson (born 1967), American musician, songwriter and expressionist painter
Stone Cold Steve Austin (Steven Anderson, born 1964), American actor, producer, and retired professional wrestler

Sports
Steven Anderson (born 1985), Scottish footballer
Steve Anderson (hurdler) (1906–1988), American Olympic athlete
Stephen Anderson (Australian footballer) (born 1968), Collingwood AFL footballer
Steve Anderson (basketball), NBA basketball referee
Steve Anderson (footballer, born 1946), Scottish footballer
Steve Anderson (karate) (1955–2020), American karate competitor
Steve Anderson (rugby union coach) (born 1963), assistant coach of Glasgow Rugby
Stephen Anderson (American football) (born 1993), American football player
Stephen Anderson (bowls) (born 1958), Australian lawn bowler

Others
Steve Anderson (open media activist), Canadian open media advocate, writer, video producer, and social media consultant
Stephen H. Anderson (born 1932), U.S. federal judge 
Stephen R. Anderson (born 1943), American linguist
Stephen Wayne Anderson (1953–2002), American murderer executed in 2002
Steven Anderson (pastor) (born 1981), American Baptist pastor
Steve Anderson (police officer), chief of the Metropolitan Nashville Police Department